Uttarlai  is a village in Barmer district of Rajasthan state of India. It also has an Air Force station nearby named after it.

References

Villages in Barmer district

External Links
https://timesofindia.indiatimes.com/city/jaipur/air-chief-flies-mig-21-in-uttarlai/articleshow/56507139.cms